Qeshlaq-e Hajj Ali Qoli Jelal va Khan Aqa (also Romanized as Qeshlāq-e Ḩājj ʿAlī Qolī Jelāl va Khān Āqā) is a village in Qeshlaq-e Shomali Rural District, in the Central District of Parsabad County, Ardabil Province, Iran. At the 2006 census, its population was 32, in 7 families.

References 

Towns and villages in Parsabad County